Prospekt Vernadskogo is a Moscow Metro station in the Prospekt Vernadskogo District, Western Administrative Okrug, Moscow. It is on the Sokolnicheskaya line, between Yugo-Zapadnaya and Universitet stations. Built in 1963, it conforms to the standard pillar-trispan design which was used for virtually all Metro stations in the 1960s. The station has pillars faced in yellowish Ural marble and walls tiled with stripes of yellow and blue. The vestibule on the north-east end of the platform contains a bust of the station's namesake, Vladimir Vernadsky. The architects were Ivan Taranov and Nadezhda Bykova.

Passengers can transfer to Prospekt Vernadskogo on the Bolshaya Koltsevaya line.

References

External links

Description of the station on Metro.ru (in Russian)
Description of the station on Mymetro.ru (in Russian)
KartaMetro.info — Station location and exits on Moscow map (English/Russian)

Moscow Metro stations
Railway stations in Russia opened in 1963
Sokolnicheskaya Line
Bolshaya Koltsevaya line
Railway stations located underground in Russia